The Wechselapparat (Wex) was a World War I German flamethrower introduced in 1916 to replace the earlier Kleif. Developed by Richard Fiedler, as early as 1901. It had a doughnut-shaped backpack fuel container with a spherical propellant container (nitrogen) in the middle that blasted the gasoline. The containers were made of welded car rims, which made it easier to carry it yourself.  A corrugated rubber hose led from the tank at the ends of which there were valves that enables mixture of fuel and propellant dispensing under pressure to the metal fuel pipe which had handles on both sides. Wex used a magnesium ignition system in a nozzle. In order for the fire to burn longer, tar was added to the gasoline or instead of it  fuel oil was completely used up. It was used throughout the war, and some survived flamethrowers have been used by the Finns in the 1920s and then converted to Flammenwerfer 40. This design was updated before the Second World War to become flamethrower model 35. However, model 35 was considered too fragile so it was soon replaced by the model 41, a simpler construction with smaller, horizontal, cylindrical backpack containers.   

The doughnut-shaped container design was copied by the British during World War II as the Flamethrower, Portable, No 2.

"Wechselapparat" is German for 'exchange apparatus'.

See also 
List of flamethrowers

References 

 Flamethrowers of the German Army 1914-1945 by Fred Koch

External links 
 

1916 establishments in Germany
Flamethrowers
World War I German infantry weapons